Peace Round: A Christmas Celebration is the holiday album of the jazz group Yellowjackets.

Track listing

Personnel 

Yellowjackets
 Russell Ferrante – pianos, synthesizers, arrangements (4, 5, 6)
 Jimmy Haslip – basses, synthesizers, arrangements (8)
 Marcus Baylor – drums, arrangements (6)
 Bob Mintzer – soprano saxophone, tenor saxophone,  arrangements (1, 2, 3, 7)

Additional arrangements 
 Jean Baylor (6)

Production 
 Yellowjackets – producers 
 Geoff Gillette – engineer, mixing, mastering 
 Yutaka Yokokura – engineer, mixing, mastering 
 Mauricio Cajuerio – assistant engineer
 Margi Denton – graphic design 
 Bryan J. Denton – photography
 Recorded, mixed and mastered at Entourage Studios (North Hollywood, California).

References

2003 Christmas albums
Christmas albums by American artists
Yellowjackets albums
Instrumental albums
Jazz Christmas albums